When the Boys Meet the Girls is the eighth studio album by the American R&B vocal group Sister Sledge, released on June 7, 1985, by Atlantic Records. It was the group's first release on the Atlantic label.

Background
Prior to this album, the group's releases had been released under the Cotillion label, a subsidiary of Atlantic which became defunct in 1985. Produced by Nile Rodgers, this album reached number nineteen in the UK charts. The two singles released from this album charted in the UK, "Frankie", released in June 1985 peaked at number one; spending seventeen weeks on the charts. The single was later was certified gold by the BPI in July 1985. The other single, "Dancing on the Jagged Edge",Released in August 1985 peaked at number 50 on the charts in the UK.

Track listing
"When the Boys Meet the Girls" (Mary Unobsky, Danny Irinstone) – 5:26
"Dancing on the Jagged Edge" (David Bryant, Dennis Herring, Lorelei McBroom) – 5:44 
"Frankie" (Joy Denny) – 4:17
"You're Fine" (Dave Conley, Bernard Jackson, David Townsend) – 5:21
"Hold Out Poppy" (Kathy Sledge, Charles Kelly) – 3:56
"The Boy Most Likely" (Nile Rodgers) – 4:12
"You Need Me" (Kathy Sledge, Tony Maiden) – 4:47
"Following the Leader" (Kathy Sledge, Philip Lightfoot) – 5:02
"Peer Pressure" (Joni Sledge, Tony Maiden) – 3:19

Personnel

Musicians

Sister Sledge
 Kathy Sledge Lightfoot – vocals
 Joni Sledge – vocals
 Debbie Sledge Young – vocals
 Kim Sledge – vocals
with:
 Nile Rodgers – guitar; Synclavier (tracks 1, 2, 4, 6), vocals (track 4), Roland Juno-60 synthesizer (tracks 6, 8), bass (tracks 6, 7)
 Herbie Hancock – Yamaha DX7 (track 5)
 Raymond Jones – piano (track 9), Yamaha DX7 & Oberheim OB-8 synthesizers (tracks 2, 3, 9)
 Rob Sabino – Yamaha DX7 bass (tracks 1, 2, 4), Prophet-5 synthesizer (tracks 3, 7), Prophet-7 synthesizer (track 1)
 James Farber – Synclavier bass (track 8)
 Tommy "Rock" Jymi (alias Nile Rodgers) – bass & Synclavier piano (track 8)
 Jimmy Bralower – drums & percussion
 Mac Gollehon – trumpet (tracks 2–4, 6 7)
 The Borneo Horns:
 Stan Harrison – alto saxophone (track 7)
 Lenny Pickett – flute, tenor saxophone solo (track 7)
 Steve Elson – flute, baritone saxophone (track 7)
 Horns arranged and conducted by Nile Rodgers
 Synclavier programming by Kevin Jones

Production

 Recorded and mixed by James Farber
 Sound engineer – Eric Mohler
 Additional engineering by Malcolm Pollack and Bobby Warner
 Additional second engineers – Eddie Delena, Garry Rindfuss and Ira McLaughlin
 Production managers – Budd Tunick & Kevin Jones
 Art direction by Bob Defrin
 Photography by Roy Volkmann
 Recorded and mixed at Power Station, New York
 Additional recording at Record Plant, L.A., California and Atlantic Studios, N.Y.

References

External links 
 Sister Sledge - When the Boys Meet the Girls (1985) album releases & credits at Discogs
 Sister Sledge - When the Boys Meet the Girls (1985) album to be listened as stream on Spotify

1985 albums
Sister Sledge albums
Albums produced by Nile Rodgers
Atlantic Records albums